The National Enterprise Corporation (NEC) is a state-owned corporation in Uganda. It is the commercial arm of the Uganda People's Defence Force. NEC was established in 1989 by an Act of the Parliament of Uganda. Its investments and activities include agriculture, manufacturing, healthcare, services, and defense industry projects and companies.

Location
The headquarters of NEC are located at Plot 2, Muwesi Road, Bugolobi, Kampala, the capital and largest city of Uganda. The coordinates of the company headquarters are 00°19'04.0"N, 32°36'08.0"E (Latitude:0.317778; Longitude:32.602223).

Organization and operations

Major subsidiaries
The major subsidiaries of NEC include the following:
 NEC Construction Works and Engineering Limited - Involved in construction and engineering work for the military and civilian sectors, including the construction of barracks and civilian houses. NEC Construction is constructing the factory of Kiira Motors Corporation, in Wairaka, Jinja, in Uganda's Eastern Region. 
 Luwero Industries Limited - Manufactures and repairs armored vehicles, electronic equipment, ordnance, and agricultural equipment. In June 2021, Luweero Industries began manufacturing medical oxygen for use in public and private medical institutions in Uganda.
 NEC Agro SMC Limited.
 NEC Uzima Limited.
 NEC Security SMC Limited.
 NEC Farm Limited.
 NEC Pharmaceuticals Limited (Being Revamped).
 NEC T6 Industrial and Business Park.

Joint ventures/Partnerships
The following are joint ventures between NEC and non-Ugandan entities.

 UgIran Company Limited - Founded in 2008 in Kampala to manufacture and assemble tractors using licensed Massey Ferguson designs. These would be built from Complete Knocked-Down kits (CKD) delivered from ITMCO's Iranian factories. UgIran is a joint venture between Iran Tractor Manufacturing Company (ITMCO) (60 percent) and NEC (40 percent).
 Kyoga Dynamics Limited
 Pro-Helit International Services Limited
 Egypt-Uganda Joint Model Farm Project
 NEC-Streit Limited
 NEC-Meat and Beans Processing Limited
 NEC Elsewedy Limited
 NEC MMP Limited

Governance
, the company is governed by a 13-person board of directors, appointed by the Uganda Ministry of Defence and Veterans Affairs. The chairman of the board is General Joram Mugume. The list of names of the board members, includes:
 Gen Joram Mugume: Chairman
 Prof Charles Kwesiga:Vice chairman
 Lt Gen Joseph Musanyifu
 Lt Gen Charles Otema AWany
 Maj Gen Geoffery Tumusiime Kastigazi
 Maj Gen Leopold Kyanda
 Brig Peter Chandia
 Mr Francis Nyabirano Kahirita
 Mr Issac Musasizi
 Dr Anna Rose Ademun Okurut
 Dr Joshua Mutambi
 Mr Hannington Ashaba
 Lt Gen James Mugira

Management
The chief executive officer of the company is Lieutenant General James Mugira, since 2015. He is deputized by Maj Gen Innocent Oula .

See also
 Ministry of Defence (Uganda)
 Kenya Shipyards Limited

References

Government agencies of Uganda
Government finances in Uganda
Military of Uganda
Organizations established in 1989
Organisations based in Kampala
1989 establishments in Uganda